Zach Currier is a Canadian professional lacrosse player who currently plays as a midfielder for Waterdogs Lacrosse Club of the Premier Lacrosse League and as a transition player for the Calgary Roughnecks of the National Lacrosse League.

Early life and career 
A native of Peterborough, Ontario, Currier has two older brothers, Josh, who is also a professional lacrosse player, and Andrei, and a younger sister, Grace. He is the son of Roger Currier and Michelle Dunn. He initially began playing lacrosse at the age of eight as a way to toughen him up for hockey. He attended Culver Military Academy for high school.

College career 
Currier attended Princeton University where he played four years of lacrosse, playing in all situations. As a senior, he led the nation in assists (34) and points (58) among midfielders, earning first team All-American honors. Additionally, he led the Tigers in caused turnovers in both of his last two seasons. Currier graduated second all-time in ground balls at Princeton with 302.

Professional career

NLL 
Currier was drafted 3rd overall by the Calgary Roughnecks in 2017, winning a championship in his second season. During the 2022 season, Currier broke the NLL record for caused turnovers in a season with 62, while also collecting 237 loose balls, the most in a single season for any player who was not a primary faceoff taker, with Inside Lacrosse considering this potentially the best season ever for a transition player. He was named the NLL Transition Player of the Year

Heading into the 2023 NLL season, Inside Lacrosse named Currier the #1 best defender in the NLL.

Currier has been the president of the NLL Players' Association since 2020.

MLL 
Currier was selected 6th overall by the Denver Outlaws in the 2017 MLL Draft, winning the championship in his second year.

PLL 
Currier elected to defect from MLL to the Premier Lacrosse League ahead of the 2020 season, being taken first overall in the PLL Entry Draft by Waterdogs Lacrosse Club. He won the Gait Brothers Midfielder of the Year Award in the 2021 season, as well as being a finalist for the Jim Brown MVP Award, having led the Waterdogs in scoring from midfield with 11 goals and 11 assists, as well as leading all non-faceoff specialists in the PLL in ground balls with 51.

Off the field 
Currier graduated with an engineering degree from Princeton and works for Warrior, helping design lacrosse equipment.

Style of play 
Currier is regarded as a "throwback" player, as he is a two-way midfielder equally capable of playing offense, defense, and taking faceoffs, a rarity in modern lacrosse. The Premier lacrosse League considers Currier as the best two-way player in the world.

Statistics

NCAA

NLL

MLL

PLL

References 

1994 births
Living people
Calgary Roughnecks players
Canadian lacrosse players
Denver Outlaws players
Princeton Tigers men's lacrosse players
Competitors at the 2022 World Games
World Games gold medalists